Tang Xianzu (September 24, 1550 – July 29, 1616), courtesy name Yireng, was a Chinese playwright of the Ming Dynasty.

Biography 
Tang was a native of Linchuan, Jiangxi and his career as an official consisted principally of low-level positions. He successfully participated in the provincial examinations (juren) at the age of 21 and at the imperial examinations (jinshi) at the age of 34. He held official positions in Nanjing, Zhejiang province, Guangdong province etc. 

After serving as the magistrate of Suichang, Zhejiang from 1593 to 1598, he retired in 1598 and returned to his hometown where he focused on writing. Tang died in 1616, the same year as famed English playwright William Shakespeare.

His major plays are collectively called the Four Dreams, because of the decisive role dreams play in the plot of each one. All of them are still performed (in scenes, or in adapted full versions) on the Chinese Kun opera (kunqu) stage. Generally considered his masterpiece, the Mudan Ting (The Peony Pavilion) has been translated into English several times.

A translation of his complete dramatic works in English was published in China in 2014 and in London in 2018.

Legacy 
A few Ming and Qing playwrights followed Tang's writing style and called themselves the Yumintang or Linchuan school.
Tang Xianzu has been known for their methodology when writing, maintaining a message disregarding logical semantics. He has been compared to both Shakespeare and Philip Sidney, who both maintained this same method.

Works

The Purple Flute
The Purple Hairpin
See The Purple Hairpin (1957) 紫釵記 (粵劇) by Tang Ti-sheng
The Peony Pavilion
Record of Handan
Record of Southern Bough

Works available in English
 The Peony Pavilion (trans. Cyril Birch). Bloomington: Indiana University Press, 1980. 
 The Peony Pavilion (trans. Wang Rongpei). Changsha: Hunan People's Press, 2000.
 A Dream Under the Southern Bough (trans. Zhang Guangqian). Beijing: Foreign Languages Press, 2003. .
 The Handan Dream (trans. Wang Rongpei). Beijing: Foreign Languages Press, 2003
 The Complete Dramatic Works of Tang Xianzu (trans. Wang Rongpei & Zhang Ling) Bloomsbury: London, 2018.

Studies available in English
Peony Pavilion Onstage : Four Centuries in the Career of a Chinese Drama (Catherine Swatek). Ann Arbor, MI: University of Michigan Center for Chinese, 2003.
Tan, Tian Yuan and Paolo Santangelo. Passion, Romance, and Qing: The World of Emotions and States of Mind in Peony Pavilion. 3 Volumes. Leiden: Brill, 2014.

References 

 Xu, Shuofang, "Tang Xianzu". Encyclopedia of China (Music and Dance Edition), 1st ed.

Further reading
 Owen, Stephen, "Tang Xian-zu, Peony Pavilion: Selected Acts," in Stephen Owen, ed. An Anthology of Chinese Literature: Beginnings to 1911. New York: W. W. Norton, 1997. p. 880-906 (Archive).

External links

 
 

Tang Xianzu (T'ang Hsien-tsu) 1550-1616
Tang Xianzu: Great Ming Dynasty Playwright

1550 births
1616 deaths
People from Fuzhou, Jiangxi
Writers from Jiangxi
Ming dynasty politicians
16th-century Chinese dramatists and playwrights
17th-century Chinese dramatists and playwrights